The Winter Anthology, published online since 2009, is an annual collection of literature. It has a very particular, consistent editorial vision, informed by an elegiac perspective on the humanities. The editors call this perspective: "A will to sustain the analog humanities as long as possible without naïveté regarding their eclipse by newer paradigms."

Michael Rutherglen writes: "The project is a vehicle for writings that continue to privilege density, precision... sensitivity to the numinous. The editors contend that nowhere else in print or on the web can such a concentration of these particular values be found... writings collected in The Winter Anthology are neither sentimental atavisms nor naïve attempts at reconstruction. Rather, they are elegies for art and artists, some explicit, many more implicit..."

The anthology has published such poets as Yves Bonnefoy, Lucie Brock-Broido, Jack Gilbert, and Charles Wright, such critics as Bruno Latour, Roberto Calasso, and Jean Baudrillard, and such fiction writers as Karl Ove Knausgård and Magdalena Tulli.

History

The anthology was founded in 2009 by Zachary Cotler, Michael Rutherglen, Olivia Clare Friedman, and Brandon Krieg. Lee Posna joined the editors in 2016. The anthology has held an annual writing contest since 2011.

See also
List of literary magazines

References

External links

Literary magazines published in the United States
Magazines established in 2009
Annual magazines published in the United States
Magazines published in California
Online magazines published in the United States